Revelation 10 is the tenth chapter of the Book of Revelation or the Apocalypse of John in the New Testament of the Christian Bible. The book is traditionally attributed to John the Apostle, but the precise identity of the author remains a point of academic debate. This chapter and the first part of the next chapter report two episodes which intervene between the sounding of the sixth and seventh trumpets.

Text
The original text was written in Koine Greek. This chapter is divided into 11 verses.

Textual witnesses
Some early manuscripts containing the text of this chapter are among others:
Papyrus 115 (ca. AD 275; extant verses 1–4, 8–11)
Papyrus 47 (3rd century; complete)
Papyrus 85 (4th century; extant verses 1–2, 5–9)
Codex Sinaiticus (330-360)
Codex Alexandrinus (400-440)
Codex Ephraemi Rescriptus (ca. 450; extant verses 1–9)

Verse 1
 I saw still another mighty angel coming down from heaven, clothed with a cloud.
And a rainbow was on his head, his face was like the sun, and his feet like pillars of fire. 
"Clothed with a cloud": and therefore clothed with something of the state with which Christ will come in judgment.

Verse 4
Now when the seven thunders uttered their voices, I was about to write; but I heard a voice from heaven saying to me, "Seal up the things which the seven thunders uttered, and do not write them."
"Uttered": or "sounded".

Verse 9 
So I went to the angel and said to him, "Give me the little book."
And he said to me, "Take and eat it; and it will make your stomach bitter, but it will be as sweet as honey in your mouth."

Verse 11 
 And he [the angel] said to me, “You must prophesy again about many peoples, nations, tongues, and kings.”

See also
 Events of Revelation
 Book of Daniel
 Jesus Christ
 John's vision of the Son of Man
 Names and titles of Jesus in the New Testament
 Related Bible parts: Revelation 9, Revelation 11

Notes

References

External links
 King James Bible - Wikisource
English Translation with Parallel Latin Vulgate 
Online Bible at GospelHall.org (ESV, KJV, Darby, American Standard Version, Bible in Basic English)
Multiple bible versions at Bible Gateway (NKJV, NIV, NRSV etc.)

10